Below is the list of populated places in Ağrı Province, Turkey, by the districts. There are 8 districts connected to Ağrı, 4 towns and 567 villages connected to these districts.

Ağrı
 Ağrı
 Ağılbaşı, Ağrı
 Ahmetbey, Ağrı
 Akbulgur, Ağrı
 Akçay, Ağrı
 Anakaya, Ağrı
 Arakonak, Ağrı
 Aslangazi, Ağrı
 Aşağı Pamuktaş, Ağrı
 Aşağıağadeve, Ağrı
 Aşağıdürmeli, Ağrı
 Aşağıkent, Ağrı
 Aşağısaklıca, Ağrı
 Aşağıyoldüzü, Ağrı
 Aşkale, Ağrı
 Badıllı, Ağrı
 Balıksu, Ağrı
 Balkaynak, Ağrı
 Ballıbostan, Ağrı
 Baloluk, Ağrı
 Başçavuş, Ağrı
 Başkent, Ağrı
 Beşbulak, Ağrı
 Beşiktepe, Ağrı
 Bezirhane, Ağrı
 Boztoprak, Ağrı
 Bölükbaşı, Ağrı
 Cumaçay, Ağrı
 Çakıroba, Ağrı
 Çamurlu, Ağrı
 Çatalipaşa, Ağrı
 Çayırköy, Ağrı
 Çobanbeyi, Ağrı
 Çukuralan, Ağrı
 Çukurçayır, Ağrı
 Dedemaksut, Ağrı
 Doğutepe, Ağrı
 Dönerdere, Ağrı
 Dumanlı, Ağrı
 Eğribelen, Ağrı
 Eliaçık, Ağrı
 Esenköy, Ağrı
 Eskiharman, Ağrı
 Geçitalan, Ağrı
 Gümüşyazı, Ağrı
 Güneysu, Ağrı
 Güvendik, Ağrı
 Güvenli, Ağrı
 Hacısefer, Ağrı
 Hanoba, Ağrı
 Hıdır, Ağrı
 Kalender, Ağrı
 Karasu, Ağrı
 Kavacık, Ağrı
 Kavakköy, Ağrı
 Kayabey, Ağrı
 Kazlı, Ağrı
 Kocataş, Ağrı
 Koçbaşı, Ağrı
 Konuktepe, Ağrı
 Kovancık, Ağrı
 Kumlugeçit, Ağrı
 Mollaali, Ağrı
 Mollaosman, Ağrı
 Murat, Ağrı
 Murathan, Ağrı
 Oğlaklı, Ağrı
 Ortakent, Ağrı
 Ortayokuş, Ağrı
 Otlubayır, Ağrı
 Ozanlar, Ağrı
 Özbaşı, Ağrı
 Özveren, Ağrı
 Sabuncu, Ağrı
 Sağırtaş, Ağrı
 Sarıca, Ağrı
 Sarıdoğan, Ağrı
 Sarıharman, Ağrı
 Sarıtaş, Ağrı
 Soğan Eleşkirt, Ağrı
 Soğancumaçay, Ağrı
 Söğütlü, Ağrı
 Suçatağı, Ağrı
 Taştekne, Ağrı
 Taypınar, Ağrı
 Tellisırt, Ağrı
 Tezeren, Ağrı
 Uçarkaya, Ağrı
 Uzunveli, Ağrı
 Yakınca, Ağrı
 Yalnızkonak, Ağrı
 Yaylaköy, Ağrı
 Yazıcı, Ağrı
 Yazılı, Ağrı
 Yığıntepe, Ağrı
 Yolluyazı, Ağrı
 Yolugüzel, Ağrı
 Yoncalı, Ağrı
 Yorgunsöğüt, Ağrı
 Yukarıdürmeli, Ağrı
 Yukarıküpkıran, Ağrı
 Yukarıpamuktaş, Ağrı
 Yukarısaklıca, Ağrı
 Yukarıyoldüzü, Ağrı
 Yurtpınar, Ağrı
 Ziyaret, Ağrı

Diyadin
 Diyadin
 Akçevre, Diyadin
 Akyolaç, Diyadin
 Altınkilit, Diyadin
 Aşağıakpazar, Diyadin
 Aşağıdalören, Diyadin
 Aşağıkardeşli, Diyadin
 Aşağıtütek, Diyadin
 Atadamı, Diyadin
 Atayolu, Diyadin
 Batıbeyli, Diyadin
 Boyalan, Diyadin
 Budak, Diyadin
 Burgulu, Diyadin
 Büvetli, Diyadin
 Davutköy, Diyadin
 Dedebulak, Diyadin
 Delihasan, Diyadin
 Dibekli, Diyadin
 Dokuztaş, Diyadin
 Gedik, Diyadin
 Göğebakan, Diyadin
 Gözüpek, Diyadin
 Günbuldu, Diyadin
 Hacıhalit, Diyadin
 Heybeliyurt, Diyadin
 İsaağa, Diyadin
 Kapanca, Diyadin
 Karapazar, Diyadin
 Karataş, Diyadin
 Kocaçoban, Diyadin
 Kotancı, Diyadin
 Kuşburnu, Diyadin
 Kuşlu, Diyadin
 Mollakara, Diyadin
 Mutlu, Diyadin
 Oğuloba, Diyadin
 Omuzbaşı, Diyadin
 Pirali, Diyadin
 Rahmankulu, Diyadin
 Satıcılar, Diyadin
 Soğuksu, Diyadin
 Sürenkök, Diyadin
 Sürmelikoç, Diyadin
 Şahinşah, Diyadin
 Şekerbulak, Diyadin
 Taşbasamak, Diyadin
 Taşkesen, Diyadin
 Tazekent, Diyadin
 Toklucak, Diyadin
 Ulukent, Diyadin
 Uysallı, Diyadin
 Yanıkçukur, Diyadin
 Yeniçadır, Diyadin
 Yeşildurak, Diyadin
 Yıldırım, Diyadin
 Yıldız, Diyadin
 Yolcupınarı, Diyadin
 Yörükatlı, Diyadin
 Yukarıakpazar, Diyadin
 Yukarıdalören, Diyadin
 Yukarıtütek, Diyadin
 Yuva, Diyadin

Eleşkirt
 Eleşkirt
 Abdiköy, Eleşkirt
 Akyumak, Eleşkirt
 Alagün, Eleşkirt
 Alkuşak, Eleşkirt
 Arifbey, Eleşkirt
 Aşağıcihanbey, Eleşkirt
 Aşağıkopuz, Eleşkirt
 Aydıntepe, Eleşkirt
 Aydoğdu, Eleşkirt
 Çatalpınar, Eleşkirt
 Çatkösedağ, Eleşkirt
 Çetinsu, Eleşkirt
 Çiftepınar, Eleşkirt
 Dalkılıç, Eleşkirt
 Değirmengeçidi, Eleşkirt
 Değirmenoluğu, Eleşkirt
 Dolutaş, Eleşkirt
 Düzağıl, Eleşkirt
 Düzyayla, Eleşkirt
 Ergözü, Eleşkirt
 Goncalı, Eleşkirt
 Gökçayır, Eleşkirt
 Gözaydın, Eleşkirt
 Güneykaya, Eleşkirt
 Güvence, Eleşkirt
 Hasanpınarı, Eleşkirt
 Haydaroğlu, Eleşkirt
 Hayrangöl, Eleşkirt
 İkizgeçe, Eleşkirt
 İkizgöl, Eleşkirt
 İndere, Eleşkirt
 Kanatgeren, Eleşkirt
 Karabacak, Eleşkirt
 Kayayolu, Eleşkirt
 Kokulupınar, Eleşkirt
 Köleköy, Eleşkirt
 Körpeçayır, Eleşkirt
 Mollahüseyin, Eleşkirt
 Mollasüleyman, Eleşkirt
 Oklavalı, Eleşkirt
 Öztoprak, Eleşkirt
 Palakçayırı, Eleşkirt
 Pirabat, Eleşkirt
 Ramazan, Eleşkirt
 Sadaklı, Eleşkirt
 Salkımlı, Eleşkirt
 Sarıköy, Eleşkirt
 Söbetaş, Eleşkirt
 Sultanabat, Eleşkirt
 Süzgeçli, Eleşkirt
 Toprakkale, Eleşkirt
 Türkeli, Eleşkirt
 Uludal, Eleşkirt
 Uzunyazı, Eleşkirt
 Yağmurlu, Eleşkirt
 Yanıkdere, Eleşkirt
 Yelkesen, Eleşkirt
 Yeşilova, Eleşkirt
 Yığıntaş, Eleşkirt
 Yukarıkopuz, Eleşkirt

Hamur
 Hamur
 Abdiçıkmaz, Hamur
 Adımova, Hamur
 Alakoyun, Hamur
 Aşağıaladağ, Hamur
 Aşağıderedibi, Hamur
 Aşağıgözlüce, Hamur
 Aşağıkarabal, Hamur
 Aşağıyenigün, Hamur
 Ayvacık, Hamur
 Baldere, Hamur
 Beklemez, Hamur
 Ceylanlı, Hamur
 Çağlayan, Hamur
 Danakıran, Hamur
 Demirkapı, Hamur
 Ekincik, Hamur
 Erdoğan, Hamur
 Esenören, Hamur
 Gültepe, Hamur
 Gümüşkuşak, Hamur
 Kaçmaz, Hamur
 Kamışlı, Hamur
 Kandildağı, Hamur
 Karadoğu, Hamur
 Karakazan, Hamur
 Karaseyitali, Hamur
 Karlıca, Hamur
 Kaynaklı, Hamur
 Kılıç, Hamur
 Köşkköy, Hamur
 Nallıkonak, Hamur
 Özdirek, Hamur
 Sarıbuğday, Hamur
 Seslidoğan, Hamur
 Seyithanbey, Hamur
 Soğanlıtepe, Hamur
 Süleymankümbet, Hamur
 Tükenmez, Hamur
 Uğurtaş, Hamur
 Yapılı, Hamur
 Yoğunhisar, Hamur
 Yukarıağadeve, Hamur
 Yukarıaladağ, Hamur
 Yukarıgözlüce, Hamur
 Yukarıyenigün, Hamur
 Yuvacık, Hamur

Patnos
 Patnos
 Akçaören, Patnos
 Akdilek, Patnos
 Aktepe, Patnos
 Akyemiş, Patnos
 Alatay, Patnos
 Andaçlı, Patnos
 Armutlu, Patnos
 Aşağıgöçmez, Patnos
 Aşağıkamışlı, Patnos
 Bağbaşı, Patnos
 Baltacık, Patnos
 Baştarla, Patnos
 Bozoğlak, Patnos
 Budak, Patnos
 Çakırbey, Patnos
 Çamurlu, Patnos
 Çaputlu, Patnos
 Çatmaoluk, Patnos
 Çavuşköy, Patnos
 Çiçek, Patnos
 Çimenli, Patnos
 Çukurbağ, Patnos
 Dağalan, Patnos
 Değirmendüzü, Patnos
 Demirören, Patnos
 Derecik, Patnos
 Dizginkale, Patnos
 Doğansu, Patnos
 Düzceli, Patnos
 Edremit, Patnos
 Ergeçli, Patnos
 Eryılmaz, Patnos
 Esenbel, Patnos
 Eskikonak, Patnos
 Gençali, Patnos
 Gökçeali, Patnos
 Gökoğlu, Patnos
 Gönlüaçık, Patnos
 Güllüce, Patnos
 Günbeli, Patnos
 Gündüz, Patnos
 Güvercinli, Patnos
 Hacılar, Patnos
 Hasandolu, Patnos
 Hisarköy, Patnos
 Karatoklu, Patnos
 Karbasan, Patnos
 Kaş, Patnos
 Kazanbey, Patnos
 Keçelbaba, Patnos
 Kızıltepe, Patnos
 Kızkapan, Patnos
 Koçaklar, Patnos
 Konakbeyi, Patnos
 Köseler, Patnos
 Kucak, Patnos
 Kuruyaka, Patnos
 Kuşkaya, Patnos
 Kürekli, Patnos
 Meydandağı, Patnos
 Mollaibrahim, Patnos
 Onbaşılar, Patnos
 Ortadamla, Patnos
 Oyacık, Patnos
 Örendik, Patnos
 Özdemir, Patnos
 Pirömer, Patnos
 Sağrıca, Patnos
 Sarıdibek, Patnos
 Suluca, Patnos
 Susuz, Patnos
 Tanyeli, Patnos
 Taşkın, Patnos
 Tepeli, Patnos
 Usluca, Patnos
 Uzunca, Patnos
 Uzungün, Patnos
 Üçoymak, Patnos
 Ürküt, Patnos
 Yalçınkaya, Patnos
 Yeşilhisar, Patnos
 Yeşilyurt, Patnos
 Yukarıdamla, Patnos
 Yukarıgöçmez, Patnos
 Yukarıkamışlı
 Yukarıkülecik, Patnos
 Yurtöven, Patnos
 Yüncüler, Patnos
 Yürekveren, Patnos
 Zincirkale, Patnos
 Zirekli, Patnos
 Ziyaret, Patnos

Taşlıçay
 Taşlıçay
 Alakoçlu, Taşlıça
 Aras, Taşlıçay
 Aşağıdumanlı, Taşlıçay
 Aşağıdüzmeydan, Taşlıçay
 Aşağıesen, Taşlıçay
 Aşağıtoklu, Taşlıçay
 Balçiçek, Taşlıçay
 Bayıraltı, Taşlıçay
 Bayramyazı, Taşlıçay
 Boyuncak, Taşlıçay
 Çöğürlü, Taşlıçay
 Çökelge, Taşlıçay
 Dilekyazı, Taşlıçay
 Düzgören, Taşlıçay
 Geçitveren, Taşlıçay
 Gözucu, Taşlıçay
 Gündoğdu, Taşlıçay
 Güneysöğüt, Taşlıçay
 İkiyamaç, Taşlıçay
 Kağnılı, Taşlıçay
 Karagöz, Taşlıçay
 Kumlubucak, Taşlıçay
 Kumluca, Taşlıçay
 Samanyolu, Taşlıçay
 Tanrıverdi, Taşlıçay
 Tanyolu, Taşlıçay
 Taşteker, Taşlıçay
 Yanalyol, Taşlıçay
 Yankaya, Taşlıçay
 Yardımcılar, Taşlıçay
 Yassıkaya, Taşlıçay
 Yeltepe, Taşlıçay
 Yukarıdumanlı, Taşlıçay
 Yukarıdüzmeydan, Taşlıçay
 Yukarıesen, Taşlıçay
 Yukarıtaşlıçay, Taşlıçay
 Yukarıtoklu, Taşlıçay

Tutak
 Tutak
 Adakent, Tutak
 Ahmetabat, Tutak
 Akyele, Tutak
 Alacahan, Tutak
 Aşağıkarahalit, Tutak
 Aşağıkargalık, Tutak
 Aşağıköşkköy, Tutak
 Aşağıkülecik, Tutak
 Aşağıözdek, Tutak
 Atabindi, Tutak
 Ataköy, Tutak
 Azizler, Tutak
 Bahçeköy, Tutak
 Batmış, Tutak
 Bayındır, Tutak
 Beydamarlı, Tutak
 Bintosun, Tutak
 Bişi, Tutak
 Bolaşlı, Tutak
 Bozkaş, Tutak
 Bulutpınar, Tutak
 Burnubulak, Tutak
 Çelebaşı, Tutak
 Çırpılı, Tutak
 Çobanoba, Tutak
 Çukurkonak, Tutak
 Dağlıca, Tutak
 Daldalık, Tutak
 Damlakaya, Tutak
 Dayıpınarı, Tutak
 Dereköy, Tutak
 Dibelek, Tutak
 Dikbıyık, Tutak
 Dikme, Tutak
 Doğangün, Tutak
 Dorukdibi, Tutak
 Dönertaş, Tutak
 Döşkaya, Tutak
 Ekincek, Tutak
 Erdal, Tutak
 Ergeçidi, Tutak
 Esmer, Tutak
 Geçimli, Tutak
 Gültepe, Tutak
 Güneşgören, Tutak
 Hacıyusuf, Tutak
 İkigözüm, Tutak
 İpekkuşak, Tutak
 İsaabat, Tutak
 Karaağaç, Tutak
 Karacan, Tutak
 Karahan, Tutak
 Karakuyu, Tutak
 Kaşönü, Tutak
 Kesik, Tutak
 Kılıçgediği, Tutak
 Mızrak, Tutak
 Mollahasan, Tutak
 Ocakbaşı, Tutak
 Oğlaksuyu, Tutak
 Ortayamaç, Tutak
 Otluca, Tutak
 Ozanpınar, Tutak
 Öndül, Tutak
 Palandöken, Tutak
 Sarıgöze, Tutak
 Sincan, Tutak
 Soğukpınar, Tutak
 Sorguçlu, Tutak
 Suvar, Tutak
 Şekerbulak, Tutak
 Taşbudak, Tutak
 Uzunöz, Tutak
 Yayıklı, Tutak
 Yenikent, Tutak
 Yeniköy, Tutak
 Yukarıkarahalit, Tutak
 Yukarıkargalık, Tutak
 Yukarıköşk, Tutak
 Yukarıözdek, Tutak

References

Ağrı
List